The Construction Industry Council (CIC) is the representative forum for professional bodies, research organisations and specialist business associations in the United Kingdom construction industry.

History
The first proposals for a Building Industry Council were made in 1985 (backed by the Chartered Institute of Building, Chartered Institution of Building Services Engineers and the Institution of Structural Engineers) but came to nothing. A further attempt followed in 1987 with support from the Royal Institute of British Architects, and the BIC was publicly launched on 16 September 1987. However, it was more than a year before a first meeting, including the Royal Institution of Chartered Surveyors, took place on 1 November 1988. The body was incorporated in May 1999, and with the Institution of Civil Engineers then a member, changed its name to the Construction Industry Council in April 1990.

Activities
The CIC provides a single voice for professionals across the built environment through its collective membership of 500,000 individual professionals and more than 25,000 firms of construction consultants. The breadth and depth of its membership means that CIC (like a small number of other bodies, including Constructing Excellence) can speak with authority on issues connected with construction without being constrained by the self-interest of any particular sector of the industry.

As representative of the views of professionals, it has a seat on the government/industry body, the Strategic Forum for Construction.

The Construction Industry Council developed and operates the Design Quality Indicator (DQI) tool to measure the design quality of buildings.

CICAIR Limited, a specially created wholly owned subsidiary of the CIC, is the sole body authorised to approve Approved Inspectors to undertake building control work in England and Wales.

Organisation
The Construction Industry Council's work is managed on a day-to day basis by a small secretariat which works under the direction of the Chief Executive who is responsible to the Council. The Executive Board acts as the main policy and strategy vehicle of the Council.

Chair

Chairs of the Building or Construction Industry Council and their terms of office:

From June 2023, the CIC is set to have its first female chair: Dr Wei Yang (a town planner and past president of the Royal Town Planning Institute). Her appointment also puts women in the majority on the CIC board.

Membership
The Construction Industry Council has three categories of membership: Full; Associate; and Honorary Affiliate Members.

Full members, as of February 2022, are:

References

External links 
 Construction Industry Council 
 Design Quality Indicator
 Interviews with Key Members at the CIC 20th Anniversary Party (Video)

Architecture organisations based in the United Kingdom
Building
Business organisations based in London
Construction trade groups based in the United Kingdom
Engineering organizations
Organisations based in the London Borough of Camden
Organizations established in 1988
Sustainability organizations
1988 establishments in the United Kingdom